Kwinitsa station is on the Canadian National Railway mainline in Kwinitsa, British Columbia on  the north side of the Skeena River across from Yellowhead highway 16.  The station is located between the Khyex River and the Kasiks River.  The station is served by Via Rail's Jasper – Prince Rupert train as a flag stop.

Footnotes

External links 
Via Rail Station Description

Via Rail stations in British Columbia